Mosiman is a surname of Swiss-German origin. Notable people with the name include:

 Billie Sue Mosiman (1947–2018), American author
 Mary Mosiman (born 1962), American politician

References

See also
 Mosimann, a list of people with the surname

Swiss-German surnames